Oceola is a census-designated place (CDP) in central Tod Township, Crawford County, Ohio, United States. As of the 2010 census its population was 190. It has a post office with the ZIP code 44860.  It is located along the road that was U.S. Route 30 until being upgraded to a freeway.

History
Oceola was laid out in 1842.  The community was named for Osceola, the leader of the Seminole in Florida. A post office called Oceola has been in operation since 1840.

References

Census-designated places in Crawford County, Ohio